Salym Petroleum Development, established in 1996, (Salym Petroleum Development, Salym Petroleum, SPD) is a joint venture between Gazprom Neft and Shell plc for development of the Salym group of oil fields in West Siberia. It is a joint-stock company incorporated under Dutch law.

History
Since 2003, Salym Petroleum Development (SPD) has been involved in the integrated development of three oil fields: West Salym, Upper Salym, and Vadelyp. In the summer of 2006 SPD exceeded an annual production volume 1 million tons, and In 2014 the company produced about 6.55 million tons of oil.

Activities
A liquefied petroleum gas (LPG) plant was commissioned in May 2012 for associated petroleum gas processing. The project was implemented by a partner company, Monolit LLC (Rose of the World group).  It currently receives petroleum gas from the Salym fields and the Shapsha group of fields, RussNeft holding the license for development of the latter. Currently, Salym Petroleum Development is working on enhanced oil recovery technology.

References

External links

 Salym Petroleum website
 Salym Petroleum on YouTube

Oil companies of Russia
Gazprom subsidiaries
Shell plc subsidiaries
Companies based in Moscow